Grzegorz Borawski (born 2 November 1967) is a retired Polish football defender.

References

1967 births
Living people
Polish footballers
GKS Katowice players
GKS Jastrzębie players
Association football defenders
People from Czechowice-Dziedzice